The 2018 edition of the Canadian Polaris Music Prize was presented on September 17, 2018. The gala was hosted by broadcaster Raina Douris.

Grand jury
The Polaris committee announced the grand jury in August 2018. Jurors were Matt Carter of Grid City , Jill Krajewski of Noisey, Erin Lowers of Exclaim!, Dustin Riel McGladrey of the Aboriginal Multi-Media Society of Alberta, Marc-André Mongrain of Radio-Canada, Josh O'Kane of The Globe and Mail, Rosina Riccardo of CJAM-FM, Kate Wilson of The Georgia Straight, and freelance music writers J.D. Considine, Marie Mello and Anubha Momin.

Shortlist

The ten-album shortlist was announced on July 17.

Longlist

The prize's preliminary 40-album longlist was announced on June 14.

Heritage Prize
Nominees for the Polaris Heritage Prize, a separate award to honour classic Canadian albums released before the creation of the Polaris Prize, were announced at the main Polaris gala, and the winners were announced on October 23.

1960–1975
  Public: Neil Young, Everybody Knows This Is Nowhere
  Jury: Jean-Pierre Ferland, Jaune
 The Band, Music from Big Pink
 Beau Dommage, Beau Dommage
 Robert Charlebois and Louise Forestier, Lindberg
 Joni Mitchell, Court and Spark
 Jackie Mittoo, Wishbone
 The Oscar Peterson Trio, Night Train
 Buffy Sainte-Marie, It's My Way!
 Jackie Shane, Jackie Shane Live

1976–1985
  Public: Rush, 2112
  Jury: Bruce Cockburn, Stealing Fire
 D.O.A., Hardcore '81
 Fifth Column, To Sir With Hate
 Gowan, Strange Animal
 Martha and the Muffins, This Is the Ice Age
 Jackie Mittoo, Showcase Volume 3
 Stan Rogers, Fogarty's Cove
 Rough Trade, Avoid Freud
 Leroy Sibbles, On Top

1986–1995
  Public: Alanis Morissette, Jagged Little Pill
  Jury: Dream Warriors, And Now the Legacy Begins
 Daniel Bélanger, Les Insomniaques s'amusent
 k. d. lang, Ingénue
 Daniel Lanois, Acadie
 Maestro Fresh Wes, Symphony in Effect
 Main Source, Breaking Atoms
 Sarah McLachlan, Fumbling Towards Ecstasy
 John Oswald, Plunderphonics
 Voivod, Nothingface

1996–2005
  Public: Broken Social Scene, You Forgot It in People
  Jury: Kid Koala, Carpal Tunnel Syndrome
 Bran Van 3000, Glee
 Constantines, Shine a Light
 The Dears, No Cities Left
 Destroyer, Streethawk: A Seduction
 Esthero, Breath from Another
 Sarah Harmer, You Were Here
 The New Pornographers, Mass Romantic
 The Weakerthans, Left and Leaving

References

External links
 Polaris Music Prize

2018 in Canadian music
2018 music awards
2018